Sunday Lick Run is a stream in the U.S. state of West Virginia.

According to local history, Sunday Lick Run was named for an incident when a hunt was conducted on a Sunday, breaking local religious taboo.

See also
List of rivers of West Virginia

References

Rivers of Pocahontas County, West Virginia
Rivers of West Virginia